Planet Ark Environmental Foundation is an Australian non-profit environmental organisation founded in 1992. Planet Ark partners with organisations in the public and private sectors to help find ways to reduce impact on the planet. Focus areas are environmental impacts of human consumption in the home, the workplace, and the community. Planet Ark's campaigns include 'Cartridges 4 Planet Ark', Australia's 'National Recycling Week', and the country's biggest annual community tree planting event, National Tree Day. The organisation is operated from its office in Sydney.

History 
Ark Australia was founded in 1992 by Paul Klymenko, Peter Shenstone and former Ark UK member Jon Dee. At the time kerbside recycling was in its infancy and environmental information was very limited. The organisation was commissioned to create 300 "Save the Planet" videos involving high profile celebrities and soon became known as Planet Ark. Several major events are organised by Planet Ark including National Tree Day, founded in 1996 with Olivia Newton-John; National Recycling Week and the Schools Recycle Right Challenge. The organisation began many high profile campaigns that have since either moved to other providers or become staples of the public recycling sphere, including 'Cards 4 Planet Ark', 'Phones for Planet Ark', Steel Can and Aluminium Can (Al Cans) recycling to name a few. To demonstrate that cleaning products could be as effective without heavy chemical composition, Planet Ark released the Aware Laundry powder range in 1994. This was soon followed by 100% recycled toilet tissue.

Campaigns 
Planet Ark's campaigns seek to promote positive action that directly changes people's behavior. The organisation is non-political and non-confrontational, aiming to unite people and business in action. Planet Ark's main objectives are to promote sustainable resource use, encourage low carbon lifestyles and connect people with nature. Planet Ark works with businesses and endorses a number of commercial products it considers to be environmentally friendly in production and manufacture, including recycled toilet paper, cleaning products and car tyres.

Planet Ark's campaigns include:
 National Tree Day is Australia's largest tree-planting and nature care event. 2014 was the biggest year in the event's history with more than 4,000 sites and events and almost 300,000 people taking part with similar numbers participating every year.  
 National Recycling Week is the annual opportunity for Australian schools, workplaces, councils and the public to focus on the benefits of recycling.  In 2013 more than 70,000 children participated in the Schools Recycling Right Challenge.
 Cartridges 4 Planet Ark is a partnership between Planet Ark, the recycler Close the Loop and six of the largest cartridge manufacturers – Brother, Canon, Epson, HP, Konica Minolta and Kyocera. By 2017 more than 30 million cartridges had been diverted from landfill with zero waste to landfill.  
 BusinessRecycling.com.au is designed to make recycling at work easy. The site lists recycling services for more than 90 different materials ranging from aluminium can to fly ash and from packaging to batteries. The site is made possible through support of the NSW EPA.  
 RecyclingNearYou.com.au is a comprehensive directory of the recycling services offered by more than 500 councils around Australia. Each year millions of enquiries are made to the site covering items that can go in their home recycling to those items that must be recycled through dedicated schemes.
 Make it Australian Recycled was launched in partnership with Australian Paper to bring attention to the fact that Australians are good at recycling, but not as active in purchasing products made from recycled materials.
 Make it Wood is designed to encourage individuals and businesses to use responsibility sourced wood as a building material. Wood, when responsibly sourced, is a building material that is renewable, that stores carbon, and offsets more carbon-intensive materials like concrete and steel.  Wood products are considered important in mitigating climate change. 
 Planet Ark Endorsed is a select range of products that offer a more environmentally responsible alternative to commonly used alternatives. The products must also be good quality and effective. Planet Ark only licenses its logo on quality products and services that, through their use, reduce our impact on the environment. Long-standing relationships include Orange Power and Aware Environmental, which produce cleaning products purchased by millions of Australians each year. Planet Ark's newest endorsement, Naturale Toilet Tissue, is manufactured in Australia from 100% recycled paper that is FSC certified.
 Everyday Nature is Planet Ark's newest activity and emerges from the organisation's research into the health and wellbeing benefits of contact with nature for both kids and adults.
 Planet Ark Power is a partnership between Planet Ark and a Queensland Energy startup called GoZERO Energy which both companies have entered into in order to speed the adoption of economically competitive commercial rooftop solar, energy storage and energy efficiency technologies.
 The Australasian Recycling Label was developed by Planet Ark and Green Chip with the Australian Packaging Covenant Organisation to create a standardised labelling system to allow consumers to make better decisions about packaging recyclability.

Celebrity supporters 
Celebrities who have fronted Planet Ark campaigns include Pierce Brosnan, Kamahl, Olivia Newton-John, Jamie Durie, Steve Irwin, Kylie Minogue, Dannii Minogue, Nicole Kidman, Tom Cruise, Shelley Craft, Richard Branson and TV personality Tim Webster. Current ambassadors include surfer Layne Beachley, TV personality James Treble,  ABC's Gardening Australia host Costa Georgiadis, Grand Designs Australia host Peter Maddison, author Anita Van Dyke, Dr Amanda Lloyd, Magdalena Roze, Ranger Stacey, Candice Dixon and children's sensation dirtgirlworld.

Popular with the Australian media for its focus on positive actions, Planet Ark's official spokesperson is former actress and television presenter turned environmentalist, Rebecca Gilling.

Criticism 
Planet Ark's carbon capture and sustainable building materials campaign 'Make it Wood' was criticised by Jon Dee and Pat Cash who appeared on television to complain about the links to the timber industry and involvement in drafting the Australian Forestry Standard. which Nick Xenophon has said "raises some serious questions of a potential conflict of interest" and caused Christine Milne to criticise the organisation. Planet Ark responded to the enquiries in a letter explaining its position in detail. The Australian Forestry Standard is an attempt to create an Australian specific standard, as opposed to the international Forest Stewardship Council and Planet Ark recommends choosing FSC wood products.

See also

 Conservation movement
 Environmental movement
 Waste management in Australia

References

External links
 
 National Tree Day - website
 National Recycling Week
 Cartridges 4 Planet Ark
 Schools Recycle Right Challenge website
 Make it Wood website
 Recycling Near You website
 Planet Ark Power campaign page
 Planet Ark Power website

Environmental organisations based in Australia
Nature conservation in Australia
Organisations based in Sydney
Organizations established in 1992